Elin Oğlu was a Turkish talk show broadcast on ATV. Based on the original South Korean show Non-Summit, it aired on ATV on Saturday nights at 23:45 Eastern European Time from 21 March 2015 to 7 May 2016.

The show was hosted by leading Turkish television personality Burcu Esmersoy and actor Sinan Çalışkanoğlu.

Members

Past members

Similar Shows

Korean shows

Non-Summit is the original show.
 In 2015, a Non-Summit spin-off with the same actors aired.

Turkish franchise
In 2014, ATV purchased the rights for a Turkish adaptation of Non-Summit, titled Elin Oğlu, which premiered on 21 March 2015.

Chinese franchises

In 2015, Jiangsu Television purchased the rights for a Chinese adaptation of Non-Summit, titled A Bright World (世界青年说), which premiered on 16 April 2015.

Informal Talks (非正式会谈) is a Chinese adaptation of Non-Summit, broadcast on Hubei Television. It began its second season in December, 2015.

References

External links

2015 Turkish television series debuts
ATV (Turkey) original programming
Non-Summit
Turkish-language television shows
Turkish television talk shows
Turkish television series based on South Korean television series